The Oxygen Green Party is a political party in Colombia founded in 1998. After Íngrid Betancourt, one of its most prominent members, was kidnapped in 2002, the party's popular support began to fade. In 2005, a political reform on the Colombian party system left the party without participation, due to low popular support. However, in 2021, it was relaunched by Betancourt and joined the Hope Center Coalition, with Betancourt and Carlos Amaya as its candidates in the coalition primaries for the 2022 Colombian presidential election.

See also

Green Party (Colombia)

External links
Oxygen Green Party (official site) (Dated February 2005)
Global Greens profile for Oxygen Green Party

1998 establishments in Colombia
Green parties in South America
Political parties established in 1998
Political parties established in 2021
Political parties in Colombia